News At Seven-Thirty (also known as News At 7:30), is the flagship evening English news programme which is broadcast daily Monday to Sunday at 7:30pm in Hong Kong on TVB Pearl. News At Seven-Thirty can also be viewed for free on the TVB News website. The programme first aired on TVB Pearl when it was launched on 19 November 1967 and is one of the longest running newscasts in Hong Kong with News at 6:30 on its sister channel TVB Jade.

Special news 
 Early Nightly World News (1 December 1988 to 30 May 1993)
 News Line (31 May 1993 to 8 July 1995)

Notable presenters 
Betty Liu
Priscilla Ng (RTHK)
Chris Lincoln (retired)
Chris Gelken  (deceased)
Tony Sabine (ISD)
James Aitken (South China Morning Post)
Jenny Lam (HKBU Journalism lecturer)
Sonya Artero (ISD)

Facts:
The show was seldom presented by only one anchor. But it increasingly seems to be the case that it will be presented by only one female anchor every day after James Aitken  resigned on July 1, 2022.

References

External links
Official website

TVB original programming
1960s Hong Kong television series
1967 Hong Kong television series debuts
Hong Kong television news shows